AT-12 may refer to
AT-12 Swinger, a missile
AT-12 Guardsman, an aircraft
AT12, (AT12T) a man portable 120mm disposable anti-tank weapon manufactured by Bofors.